Robert Allenstein (born 8 September 1991) is a professional German darts player who plays in Professional Darts Corporation events.

He reached the last 32 of the 2016 World Masters. That year, he also won the Austrian Open in Vienna.

References

External links
Profile and stats on Darts Database

Living people
German darts players
1991 births
Professional Darts Corporation associate players
Sportspeople from Hamburg